Sofie Aubert Lindbæk (19 May 1875 – 29 October 1953) was a Norwegian author, teacher, and film critic. 

She was born in Christiania to the professor, jurist, and politician Ludvig Mariboe Benjamin Aubert (1838–1896) and the author Elise Aubert (1837–1909). 

Lindbæk graduated from Olaf Berg's lærerinneskole in Christiania in 1896 and worked as teacher until 1902 when she married the Danish historian Johannes Peder Lindbæk (1872-1919) and moved to Denmark. After the death of her husband, she moved with her children back to Norway. 
Lindbæk was a teacher at Nissen Girls' School in Oslo from 1920 to 1936, before becoming a film critic from 1935 to 1940.

Lindbæk was the sister of jurist Vilhelm Mariboe Aubert (1868–1908) and the mother of journalist and war correspondent Lise Lindbæk (1905–1961).

Selected works
Fanny Ramm, 1900
Den yngste, 1905
Student, 1907
Landflygtige; af Aubert'ske papirer, 1910
Hjemmet paa Fæstningen; af Aubert'ske papirer, 1912
Fra Det norske selskabs kreds, 1913
Moer Korens dagbøker, 1915

References

1875 births
1953 deaths